This is a list of the complete squads for the 2017 Americas Rugby Championship, an annual rugby union tournament contested by Argentina XV, Brazil, Canada, Chile, United States and Uruguay. Argentina XV are the defending champions.

Note: Number of caps and players' ages are indicated as of 3 February 2017 – the tournament's opening day.

Argentina XV
Argentina XV 31-man for the 2017 Americas Rugby Championship.

1 With only one scrum half named in the squad, Juan Manuel Lescano was later added to the team.

2 Jaguares player Ignacio Larrague and Lautaro Bazán were called up to the squad ahead of the second round.

3 On 15 February Germán Schulz was drafted into the squad from the Pumas 7's side.

4 On 22 February, Emiliano Boffelli and Facundo Gigena were released by their Super Rugby side to gain game time after injury.

5 Gabriel Ascárate was released by his Super Rugby side to gain game time after injury.

Head Coach:  Felipe Contepomi

Brazil
Brazil's initial 26-man squad ahead of their opening game against Chile.

1 Caíque Silva and Pedro Bengaló, who is uncapped, were called up to the squad ahead of Brazil's clash against the United States.

2 Cléber Dias, Ariel Rodrigues, Robert Tenório and Endy Willian were added to the squad ahead of the third round game against Uruguay.

3 Gabriel Paganini was added to the squad ahead of Brazil playing Argentina XV in round 4.

4 Luan Almeida, Lucas Duque and Luca Tranquez were added to the squad ahead of the final round.

Head Coach:  Rodolfo Ambrosio

Canada
On 23 January, Anscombe named an extended squad of 29 players ahead of the 2017 Americas Rugby Championship.

1 On 16 February, Lucas Albornoz was called up to the squad as injury cover for Matt Beukeboom.

2 On 22 February, English based player Brett Beukeboom joined the squad ahead of playing Uruguay, while Kainoa Lloyd earned his first call up as cover for Taylor Paris.

Head Coach:  Mark Anscombe

Chile
Chile's 36-man squad for the 2017 Americas Rugby Championship.

1 On 8 February Martín Mendoza was called up as injury cover for Tomás Dussaillant.

2 Nelson Calderón and Sebastián Valech were called up ahead of the third round match against Argentina XV.

3 Ernesto Ugarte was called up to the squad on 21 February as injury cover for Gonzalo Martínez, while Matías Contreras returned to the squad after recovering from injury.

Head Coach:  Bernard Charreyre

United States
America's 35-man squad for the 2017 Americas Rugby Championship.

1 Spike Davies and Peter Tiberio were called up to the squad ahead of the second round game against Brazil.

Head Coach:  John Mitchell

Uruguay
Uruguay's initial squad for the 2017 Americas Rugby Championship.

1 Manuel Diana, Lucas Durán, Martín Espiga, Nicolás Freitas and Ignacio García were call called up to the squad ahead of the second round game against Argentina XV.

2 Juan Manuel Gaminara, Mario Sagario and Andrés Vilaseca returned to the squad after recovering from injury, while Lorenzo Surraco joined the squad ahead of the third round clash with Brazil.

3 Ahead of round 4, Gastón Mieres returned to the team after recovering from a shoulder injury.

Head Coach:  Esteban Meneses

References

2017 squads
Rugby union squads